Kratié (also transliterated Kracheh) may refer to:
Kratié (town), a town in Kratié Commune, Cambodia
Kratié Commune, a commune in Kratié District, Cambodia
Kratié District, a district in Kratié Province, Cambodia
Kratié Province, a province in Cambodia

th:จังหวัดกระแจะ